Dendrobium revolutum is a species of flowering plant in the family Orchidaceae. It is native to Indochina (Laos, Thailand, Myanmar and Malaysia).

References

revolutum
Flora of Indo-China
Flora of Peninsular Malaysia
Plants described in 1840